Baro is the third album by Habib Koité & Bamada.
It includes a new Afro-Cuban version of his first commercial hit "Cigarette Abana", (originally found on his first album, Muso Ko).

Track listing
 "Batoumambe"
 "Kanawa"
 "Wari"
 "Sin Djen Djen"
 "Cigarette Abana (Baro Version)"
 "Woulaba"
 "Baro"
 "Sambara"
 "Roma"
 "Tere"
 "Mali Sadio"
 "Takamba"
 "Sinama Denw"

References

2001 albums